Jeff Nzokira (born 24 October 1987) is a Burundian footballer who currently plays for FC Dikhil as a goalkeeper.

Career
He played for the Vital'O FC and Djibouti Télécom. He made his international debut for Burundi in 2011.

References

External links

1987 births
Living people
Association football goalkeepers
Burundian footballers
Burundi international footballers
Burundian expatriate footballers
Vital'O F.C. players
Expatriate footballers in Djibouti
AS Ali Sabieh/Djibouti Télécom players
Djibouti Premier League players
Burundian expatriate sportspeople in Djibouti